Theoderich of Are (German: Dietrich von Are, Dutch: Dirk van Are; 1087–1126) was the first count of Are (the area around Ahrweiler in present-day Rhineland-Palatinate, Germany).

Theoderich was a nephew of bishop Odo of Toul, who in 1065 bestowed on him Heerlen and Steinfeld Abbey. He was made count of Are by Holy Roman Emperor Henry IV.

Theoderich probably built Are Castle in Altenahr. He also initiated the construction of the Pancratiuskerk in Heerlen, and possibly of the Schelmentoren in the same town, where he may have stayed.

Theoderich had six sons, three of whom became part of the clergy. He was succeeded by his first son Lotharius. His second son, Gerhard, was from 1124 to 1169 provost of St. Cassius in Bonn (Bonn Minster), and from 1154 to 1160 provost of the St. Servatius in Maastricht.

References

1087 births
1126 deaths
History of Limburg (Netherlands)